Kumariya Khera is a village in Udaipur district in the Indian state of Rajasthan. It is located 34 KM towards south of the Udaipur city and falls under Udaipur Lok Sabha constituency.

References 

Villages in Udaipur district